Wang Liping (born July 8, 1976 in Fengcheng, Dandong, Liaoning) is a Chinese race walker who became an Olympic champion by winning the 20 kilometer event in 2000. Four years later in Athens she finished eighth in the 20 kilometre walk race. Wang Liping also participated in the 2017 Liupanshui International Marathon held in Liupanshui, Guizhou Province, China.

Her personal best time is 1:26:23 hours, which puts her 8th on the all-time performers list.

References

 
 

1976 births
Living people
Chinese female racewalkers
Athletes (track and field) at the 2000 Summer Olympics
Athletes (track and field) at the 2004 Summer Olympics
Olympic athletes of China
Olympic gold medalists for China
Sportspeople from Dandong
Athletes from Liaoning
Medalists at the 2000 Summer Olympics
Olympic gold medalists in athletics (track and field)
Universiade medalists in athletics (track and field)
People from Fengcheng, Liaoning
Manchu sportspeople
Universiade bronze medalists for China
Medalists at the 2001 Summer Universiade